Live at the Fillmore is a limited release double CD recording of a live show by the Residents.  To celebrate their 25th anniversary, the Residents performed a series of concerts during the last week of October 1997.  The first part of the show featured mainly songs from their Gingerbread Man, Freak Show and Have a Bad Day albums, and the second half a performance of their live piece, "Disfigured Night".  The recording on this release is from the October 31, 1997 performance.

Two releases were made by Ralph America.  The original, in 1998, was a limited run of 1200 copies.  It was re-released in 2005 in a second run of 1000 copies, with a note on the inside showing that it was a second pressing.

Track listing
 Jambalaya. Not at all.
 44
 The Gingerbread Man
 Part 1 - The Aging Musician
 Part 2 - The Old Woman
 Part 3 - The Sold-Out Artist
 Everyone Comes to the Freak Show
 Loss of Innocence
 Jelly Jack (The Boneless Boy)
 Lottie (The Human Log)
 Ted
 Benny (The Bouncing Bump)
 Disfigured Night
 Introduction
 Disfigured Night 1
 Disfigured Night 2
 Disfigured Night 3
 Disfigured Night 4
 Disfigured Night 5
 Disfigured Night 6
 Disfigured Night 7 (We Are the World)
 Hello Skinny
 This Is a Man's Man's Man's World
 Curtain Call
 Good Night (Cruel World)

Albums recorded at the Fillmore
The Residents live albums
1998 live albums